Friedrich Georg Wilhelm von Struve (trans. Vasily Yakovlevich Struve; 15 April 1793 – ) was a German and Russian astronomer and geodesist. He is best known for studying double stars and for initiating a triangulation survey later named Struve Geodetic Arc in his honor.

Life

He was born to the aristocratic Struve family at Altona, Duchy of Holstein (then a part of the Denmark–Norway kingdoms), the son of Jacob Struve (1755–1841). To avoid military service during the French occupation of Holstein, his family moved to the Russian Empire, equipped with Danish passports.

In 1808 he entered the University of Tartu (Dorpat), where he first studied philology, but soon turned his attention to astronomy. From 1813 to 1820, he taught at the university and collected data at the Tartu Observatory, and in 1820 became a full professor and director of the observatory. His teachings have had a strong effect that is still felt at the university.

Struve was occupied with research on double stars and geodesy in Dorpat until 1839, when he founded and became director of the new Pulkovo Observatory near St Petersburg. Among other honors, he won the Gold Medal of the Royal Astronomical Society in 1826. He was elected a Fellow of the Royal Society in March 1827 and was awarded their Royal Medal the same year. Struve was elected a member of the Royal Swedish Academy of Sciences in 1833, and a Foreign Honorary Member of the American Academy of Arts and Sciences in 1834. In 1843 he formally adopted Russian nationality. He retired in 1862 due to failing health.

The asteroid 768 Struveana was named jointly in his honour and that of Otto Wilhelm and Karl Hermann Struve and a lunar crater was named for another 3 astronomers of the Struve family: Friedrich Georg Wilhelm, Otto Wilhelm and Otto.

Works

Struve's name is best known for his observations of double stars, which he carried on for many years. Although double stars had been studied earlier by William Herschel and John Herschel and Sir James South, Struve outdid any previous efforts.  He discovered a very large number of double stars and in 1827 published his double star catalogue Catalogus novus stellarum duplicium. Stars of his catalogue are sometimes indicated by the Greek letter sigma, Σ. Thus, 61 Cygni is also designated as Σ2758.

Since most double stars are true binary stars rather than mere optical doubles (as William Herschel had been the first to discover), they orbit around their common barycenter and slowly change position over the years. Thus Struve made micrometric measurements of 2714 double stars from 1824 to 1837 and published these in his work Stellarum duplicium et multiplicium mensurae micrometricae.

Struve carefully measured the "constant of aberration" in 1843. He was also the first to measure the parallax of the star Vega, although Friedrich Bessel had been the first to measure the parallax of a star (61 Cygni).

In an 1847 work, Etudes d'Astronomie Stellaire: Sur la voie lactee et sur la distance des etoiles fixes, Struve was one of the first astronomers to identify the effects of interstellar extinction (though he provided no mechanism to explain the effect). His estimate of the average rate of visual extinction, 1 mag per kpc, is remarkably close to modern estimates (0.7–1.0 mag per kpc).

He was also interested in geodetic surveying, and in 1831 published Beschreibung der Breitengradmessung in den Ostseeprovinzen Russlands. He initiated the Struve Geodetic Arc, which was a chain of survey triangulations stretching from Hammerfest in Norway to the Black Sea, through ten countries and over 2,820 km, to establish the exact size and shape of the earth. UNESCO listed the chain on its List of World Heritage Sites in Europe in 2005.

In 1853, he was elected as a member of the American Philosophical Society.

Family
Struve was the second of a dynasty of astronomers through five generations. He was the great-grandfather of Otto Struve and the father of Otto Wilhelm von Struve. He was also the grandfather of Hermann von Struve, who was Otto Struve's uncle.

In 1815 he married Emilie Wall (1796–1834) in Altona, who bore 12 children, 8 of which survived early childhood.

After his first wife died, he remarried to Johanna Henriette Francisca Bartels (1807–1867), a daughter of the mathematician Martin Bartels, who bore him six more children. The most well-known was Karl de Struve (1835–1907), who served successively as Russian ambassador to Japan, the United States, and the Netherlands.

Bernhard's son Pyotr Struve (1870–1944) is probably the best known member of the family in Russia proper (his other descendants mainly resided in Estonia and Latvia, and subsequently in Germany). He was one of the first Russian marxists and penned the manifesto of the Russian Social Democratic Labour Party upon its creation in 1898. Even before the party split into Bolsheviks and Mensheviks, Struve left it for the Constitutional Democratic party, which promoted ideas of liberalism. He represented this party at all the pre-revolutionary State Dumas. After the Russian Revolution, he published several striking articles on its causes and joined the White movement. In the governments of Pyotr Wrangel and Denikin he was one of the ministers. During the following three decades, Pyotr lived in Paris, while his children were prominent in the Russian Orthodox Church Outside of Russia.

See also
 List of Russian astronomers and astrophysicists

References

External links

 Portraits of Friedrich Georg Wilhelm Struve from the Lick Observatory Records Digital Archive, UC Santa Cruz Library's Digital Collections 
Estonian souvenir sheet and first day cover dedicated to Struve and Struve Geodetic Arc (2011)

1793 births
1864 deaths
People from Altona, Hamburg
19th-century German astronomers
Astronomers from the Russian Empire
Scientists from the Russian Empire
Recipients of the Gold Medal of the Royal Astronomical Society
University of Tartu alumni
Academic staff of the University of Tartu
Royal Medal winners
Russian people of German descent
Friedrich Georg Wilhelm
Full members of the Saint Petersburg Academy of Sciences
Members of the Royal Swedish Academy of Sciences
Fellows of the American Academy of Arts and Sciences
Foreign Members of the Royal Society
Founding members of the Russian Geographical Society
Recipients of the Pour le Mérite (civil class)
German geodesists
Geodesists from the Russian Empire
Members of the Göttingen Academy of Sciences and Humanities